Brugsch is a surname. Notable people with the surname include:

Heinrich Karl Brugsch (1827–1894), German Egyptologist
Theodor Brugsch (1878–1963), German internist and politician
Émile Brugsch (1842–1930), German Egyptologist

German-language surnames